Apsus Vallis is a channel in the Cebrenia quadrangle of Mars, located at 35.1° north latitude and 225° west longitude.  It is 120 km long and was named after a classical river in ancient Macedonia, the present-day Seman River.

References 

Cebrenia quadrangle
Valleys and canyons on Mars